Muhammad Saad al-Beshi (Arabic: محمد سعد البيشي; born 1961) has been an executioner for the government of Saudi Arabia since 1998.  He has been described as "Saudi Arabia's leading executioner". Beshi claims to have executed ten people in one day.

Al-Beshi performs executions by decapitation, using a sword, and occasionally uses a firearm. Al-Beshi also performs amputations of limbs when required under Saudi Arabia's sharia law.

Al-Beshi is married and is the father of seven children. He has been known to allow his children to help clean his sword.

Notes

1961 births
Living people
Saudi Arabian people of African descent
Saudi Arabian executioners
Saudi Arabian Muslims
Swordfighters